The 1715 Treasure Fleet was actually a combination of two Spanish treasure fleets returning from the New World to Spain, the "Nueva Españo Fleet", under Capt.-General Don Juan Esteban de Ubilla, and the "Tierra Firme Fleet", under Don Antonio de Echeverz y Zubiza. At two in the morning on Wednesday, July 31, 1715, seven days after departing from Havana, Cuba, all eleven ships of the fleet were lost in a hurricane along the east coast of Florida. A 12th ship, the French frigate "Le Grifon", had sailed with the fleet. Its captain was unfamiliar with the Florida coastline and elected to stay further out to sea. The "Grifon" safely returned to Europe.

Because the fleet was carrying silver, it is also known as the 1715 Plate Fleet (plata being the Spanish word for silver). Some artifacts and even coins still wash up on Florida beaches from time to time. According to Cuban records, around 1,500 sailors perished while a small number survived in lifeboats. Many ships, including pirates, took part in the initial salvage. Initially a privateer, Henry Jennings was first accused of piracy for attacking such salvage ships and claiming their salvages.

Exhibits and preserves
Treasure hunter Kip Wagner's team built an exhibit held at National Geographic "Explorers Hall" in Washington, D.C. that was featured in the January 1965 issue of National Geographic. This was the beginning of a fine collection of 1715 plate fleet treasure that brought hundreds of visitors from around the world. Wagner published his book Pieces of Eight (Recovering The Riches Of A Lost Spanish Fleet) in 1966. This is a detailed account of the finding and exploration of many of these shipwrecks along the Florida "Treasure Coast." An exhibit was set up with a grand opening on May 1, 1967, at the First National Bank of Satellite Beach, Florida.

In 1987, another ship in the fleet, the Urca de Lima, became the first shipwreck in the Florida Underwater Archaeological Preserves.

Mel Fisher's company, Mel Fisher's Treasures, sold the rights to the 1715 Fleet shipwreck to Queens Jewels, LLC.

In 2015, 1715 Fleet - Queens Jewels, LLC and their founder Brent Brisben discovered $4.5 million in gold coins off the coast of Vero Beach, Florida; the coins come from the 1715 Fleet shipwreck site known as the Corrigans wreck.

List of identified ships
 Urca de Lima (Santissima Trinidad)
 former HMS Hampton Court (1678) (Nuestra Señora del Carmen y San Antonio)
 Santo Cristo de San Roman
 Nuestra Señora de las Nieves
 Nuestra Señora del Rosario y San Francisco Xavier
 Nuestra Señora del Carmen y San Antonio
 Nuestra Señora de Regla
 Nuestra Señora de la Popa (La Holandesa)
New evidence (see Jorge Proctor, 2021) shows that the Douglass Beach Wreck, long believed to be the "Nuestra Señora de las Nieves", is in fact the "Santa Rita y Las Animas", bought by Ubilla in Cuba and renamed "Nuestra Señora de Regla", like his flagship.

In popular culture
In the 2008 movie Fool's Gold, the protagonists are searching for the location of one of the sunken ships of the treasure fleet (along with its treasure).

The treasure fleet was used as the backdrop for a scene in the video game Assassin's Creed IV: Black Flag. The main character, Edward Kenway, is aboard one of the ships in the fleet as a prisoner, and manages to escape with the help of his future quartermaster, Adéwalé, recruiting other captive pirates as a crew. The pirates eventually manage to escape the fleet and the hurricane by stealing the twelfth ship, the brig El Dorado, which Edward keeps and renames the Jackdaw, becoming the player's ship for the rest of the game. Edward later makes reference to the event when Blackbeard inquires as to how he got the Jackdaw, and the latter then suggests visiting the site to salvage some of the lost treasure.

In the 1977 movie The Deep "David Sanders (Nick Nolte) and his British girlfriend Gail Berke (Jacqueline Bisset) recover a number of artifacts (from a diving expedition off the coast of Bermuda), including an ampule of amber-colored liquid and a medallion bearing the image of a woman and the letters 'S.C.O.P.N' (an abbreviation of the Latin 'Santa Clara Ora Pro Nobis' that translates to English as 'Saint Clara Pray For Us') and a date, 1714. St. David's Lighthouse keeper and treasure-hunter Romer Treece (Robert Shaw), believes the medallion had come from the wreckage of the surviving twelfth ship [of the 1715 Treasure Fleet], thought to be a French tobacco ship that was being protected by the 1715 fleet and named Grifon (spelt "El Grifón" in Peter Benchley's novel The Deep). The ship was thought to be returning to Havana, Cuba for repairs but instead sank off the coast of Bermuda."

The plot of the Starz show Black Sails revolves heavily around the 1715 Treasure Fleet in its first season. The largest of the ships, the Urca de Lima, is wrecked during the hurricane off the coast of Florida, carrying five million Spanish dollars' worth in gold, silver and other precious materials, pursued by Captain Flint and his crew. The treasure, colloquially referred to as "the Urca gold", is an important plot device throughout the series.

See also 
 McLarty Treasure Museum
 Mel Fisher's Treasure Museum
 Piracy in the Caribbean
 St. Lucie County Historical Museum
 Survivors' and Salvagers' Camp – 1715 Fleet
 Treasure hunting

References

External links
 1715 Fleet Society – Dedicated to researching the history of the 1715 Fleet, its loss, rediscovery and recovery through images, video, and documents.
 1715 Treasure Fleet – website of the official salvors of the wrecks
 History of the 1715 Treasure Fleet. The Practical Book of Cobs 4th Ed. Sedwick – The Treasure of Cape Canaveral published in Indian River Journal by Brevard Historical Commission.
 Sunken Treasure: Six Who Found Fortunes, Robert F. Burgess, Dodd, Mead & Co. 1988

Treasure from shipwrecks
Treasure Coast
Piracy in the Caribbean